Lim Yi Wei (Chinese: 林怡威; pinyin: Lín yí wēi; born 27 November 1989) is a Malaysian politician from the Democratic Action Party (DAP), a component party of the ruling Pakatan Harapan (PH) coalition at state level and opposition coalition at the federal level. She has served as Member of the Selangor State Legislative Assembly (MLA) for Kampung Tunku since June 2018.
 
She has also served as the DAP Wanita Selangor Organising Secretary (2018 – present); DAP Socialist Youth (DAPSY) Damansara division chief (2018 – present); DAPSY Malaysia International Secretary (2022 – present); and Treasurer for the PH National Youth Wing, Angkatan Muda Harapan (AMH) (2022 – present). She has also been closely affiliated with the Selangor Rugby Union since 2019 and was recently appointed by the Selangor Sports Council (Majlis Sukan Negeri Selangor) as its foster assemblyman.

Early life 
 
Lim was born in Ipoh, Perak. She is the eldest of three children. Her parents are retired teachers. Outside politics, she played university rugby and has a YouTube channel of piano covers. In 2007, Lim was conscripted to join the National Service Training Programme.

Education 
 
Lim received her secondary education at SMK (P) Methodist Ipoh and took the Sijil Tinggi Persekolahan Malaysia (STPM) at SMK Methodist (ACS) Ipoh.
 
She graduated from the Hong Kong University of Science & Technology (HKUST) with a Bachelor of Business Administration (BBA) in Finance on a scholarship sponsored by Kerry Holdings Ltd. As an international student representative in the HKUST Business School Undergraduate Representatives’ Committee, she helped establish the Business Cohort Community (BCC) to help integrate freshmen. In 2013, she ran a 2-day emergency fundraiser for victims of Typhoon Haiyan in the Philippines, raising up to HKD 75,000 (USD 9,600).

Early career 
 
Upon graduating, Lim worked as a conference producer covering Asia at Incisive Media’s Hong Kong (now known as Infopro Digital Risk (IP) Limited) office in 2014 – 2015. Her portfolio included two brands: Waterstechnology, covering financial technology and data for capital markets; and Risk.net, covering risk management, derivatives, and regulation.
 
Lim also pioneered the first Asia Pacific (APAC) blockchain training course for capital markets players, Blockchain Bootcamp, held in Singapore in May 2016. Despite having left Incisive for Malaysian politics by then, the bootcamp has been replicated in Hong Kong and Sydney.

Political career 
 
Spurred by the Hong Kong Umbrella Movement, Lim returned to Malaysia to participate in Malaysian politics in January 2016. She began her political career as the political secretary of Tony Pua, Member of Parliament (MP) for Damansara (previously named Petaling Jaya Utara) and DAP’s National Publicity Secretary at that time.
 
In September 2016, Lim was appointed as a Councillor for the Petaling Jaya City Council (MBPJ). Besides tending to local government issues, she championed issues such as youth and women empowerment and mental health, organising various forums and lectures.
 
In 2018, Lim was nominated as a DAP candidate for the Kampung Tunku state constituency during the 14th general election (GE14). She won the seat with a majority of 30,444 votes, beating MCA’s Tan Gim Tuan and Kampung Tunku's first female representative. At the age of 28 she was one of the youngest candidates in Selangor. She was also named as one of Prestige Magazine’s 40 Under 40 in 2019. 
 
In October 2018, Lim was a Professional Fellow under the Young Southeast Asian Leaders Initiative (YSEALI). She spent 4 weeks at the Massachusetts General Court with the offices of State Representative Michael Moran and State Senator Jamie Eldridge. She was also invited to speak on women’s representation in Malaysian politics to a study group under Amy Dacey at the Harvard University Institute of Politics.

Issues and causes 
 
1. Womens’ rights and empowerment
 
Lim is an advocate for more meaningful women’s participation in politics. She is also a firm supporter of women’s NGOs. Efforts include contributing RM10,000 to the All-Women’s Action Society (AWAM) Malaysia in 2019 to start their hotline Telenita. Under the Selangor state government’s Pusat Wanita Berdaya (PWB) programme, Lim’s office has organised several workshops on sexual and reproductive health and rights (SRHR), a taboo topic in conservative-leaning Malaysia. 
 
Lim has also been openly supportive of protecting mothers with unwanted pregnancies via Orphancare. She also opposes child marriage and sexual harassment, especially with respect to the issue of “period spot checks” in schools. In 2021, she and Maria Chin Abdullah, MP for Petaling Jaya, issued a joint statement calling for the reinstatement of a Mongolian woman’s rape case. 
 
In 2022, Lim and Michelle Ng (ADUN Subang Jaya) submitted a paper to the Selangor state government to set up a legal aid fund. This was spurred by meeting many single mothers who had yet to divorce and couldn’t apply for government benefits (“ibu tinggal”). The paper was successfully accepted and has been newly implemented as the Selangor Legal Aid Fund (“Dana Bantuan Guaman Selangor”).
 
Lim also supports the Selangor and national women’s rugby teams and is an advocate for sports as an avenue to empower women physically.
 
2. Youth empowerment and civic education
 
Lim supports lowering of the voting age from 21 years old to 18 (Undi18). She writes and is frequently invited to speak on the topic of youth leadership within the political and activism sphere, voter education, and election reform. Before GE14, Lim led the PJ Utara parliament’s opposition towards malapportionment and gerrymandering during the last electoral constituency delineation exercise. 
 
Lim is also one of the co-founders of the PJ Startup Festival, a grassroots event that aims to introduce startups to the local communities and enrich discussion within the Malaysian startup ecosystem. She was also a judge at Selangor Information Technology & Digital Economy Corporation’s (Sidec) Pitch@Selangor 2019. 
 
3. Healthcare
 
Lim has consistently pushed for the decriminalisation of suicide through the repealing/amending of Section 309 of the Penal Code, and a moratorium on prosecutions of suicide survivors in the meantime. In collaboration with Michelle Ng (ADUN Subang Jaya), she submitted a paper on subsidising therapy sessions for the poor. This was accepted by the Selangor state government and was developed into the Selangor Mental Sihat (SeHAT Selangor) initiative within the Selangkah app, where users could undergo screenings for Depression Anxiety Stress Scales (DASS) and ideation, and access preliminary counselling. 
 
Taking it further, Lim has proposed subsidising the cost of psychiatric drugs for the poor as well as recognising social inequalities as a determinant of mental health and tackling them accordingly.
 
During the COVID-19 pandemic in Malaysia, Lim founded the “Bantu Hero Kami” (“Help Our Heroes”) campaign to fundraise for two public hospitals: Hospital Segamat, Johor (2020) and Hospital Sungai Buloh, Selangor (2021). Both campaigns raised RM 196,124 (~ USD 43,323) and RM 71,505 (~USD 15,795) respectively, enabling the purchase of essential ICU and surgical equipment. Lim also collaborated with car-sharing company called GoCar, founding the GoVax campaign, which provided free transportation to the elderly and Peoples With Disabilities (PWDs) to vaccination centres. 
 
Lim was one of many legislators questioning Khairy Jamaluddin over the RM70 million allocated for MySejahtera, the national immunisation programme’s (PICK) data integration and appointment system.
 
In October 2020, she tested positive for COVID-19 following the Sabah state elections. 
 
4. Culture and inclusivity
 
Lim is a strong supporter of local cultural efforts. These include supporting award-winning Khuan Loke Dragon & Lion Dance Association; Fusion Wayang Kulit, which aims to retell wayang kulit with a modern twist; 2 international award-winning traditional dance teams from SK Kampung Tunku and SMK (P) Sri Aman; and restoring a monument to Malaysia’s 1st Prime Minister Tunku Abdul Rahman. 
 
Lim also organised an interfaith iftar in Masjid Kampung Tunku, inviting leaders of other faiths to break fast together during Ramadan.

Election results

References 

 
 
 
 
 
 
 
 
 
 
 
 
 
 
 
 
 
 
 
 
 
 
 
 
 
 
 
 
 
 
 
 
 

1989 births
Living people
Democratic Action Party (Malaysia) politicians